Laurier—Outremont was a federal electoral district in Quebec, Canada, that was represented in the House of Commons of Canada from 1917 to 1935.

This riding was created in 1914 from parts of Jacques Cartier, St. Antoine and St. Lawrence ridings.

It initially consisted of Laurier and Outremont wards, Côte-des-Neiges ward, the town of Mount Royal, Mount Royal ward and Mount Royal Park of the city of Montreal.

In 1924, it was redefined to consist of the city of Outremont, and the part of the city of Montreal bounded by a line starting from the north-eastern boundary of the city of Outremont, following Mount Royal Avenue, Henri Julien Avenue, Mozart Street, Drolet Street, the extension of Isabeau Street. St. Lawrence Boulevard,  Baby Street, the Canadian Pacific Railway track,  Atlantic Avenue, to the northern limit of the city of Outremont, and along that boundary to Mount Royal Avenue.

The electoral district was abolished in 1933 when it was divided into Laurier and Outremont ridings.

Members of Parliament

This riding elected the following Members of Parliament:

Election results

By-election: Acceptance by the Honourable Sir Lomer Gouin of an office of emolument under the Crown, 29 December 1921

See also 

 List of Canadian federal electoral districts
 Past Canadian electoral districts

External links
Riding history from the Library of Parliament

Former federal electoral districts of Quebec